Trust the Navy is a 1935 British comedy film directed by Lupino Lane and starring Lane, Nancy Burne and Wallace Lupino. It was made at Cricklewood Studios. It marked the screen debut of Guy Middleton, who went on to be a leading character actor in British films of the following decades.

Cast
 Lupino Lane as Nip Briggs  
 Nancy Burne as Susie  
 Wallace Lupino as Wally Wopping  
 Guy Middleton as Lieutenant Richmond  
 Miki Hood as Andree Terraine  
 Ben Welden as Scar  
 Fred Leslie as Chief Petty Officer  
 Doris Rogers as Martha 
 Reginald Long as Serge Chungster  
 Arthur Rigby as Lambert Terrain 
 Charles Sewell 
 Arthur Stanley

References

Bibliography
Chibnall, Steve. Quota Quickies: The Birth of the British 'B' Film. British Film Institute, 2007.
Low, Rachael. Filmmaking in 1930s Britain. George Allen & Unwin, 1985.
Wood, Linda. British Films, 1927–1939. British Film Institute, 1986.

External links
 

1935 films
1935 comedy films
British comedy films
Films shot at Cricklewood Studios
Films directed by Lupino Lane
British black-and-white films
1930s English-language films
1930s British films